John Fox (June 30, 1835January 17, 1914) was an American mechanic, merchant and politician from New York. He served two terms in the United States House of Representatives from 1867 to 1871.

Life
Born to Irish emigrants in Fredericton in the New Brunswick Colony in British Canada, Fox immigrated to the United States with his parents in 1840, settling in New York City, New York. He attended public schools as a child, engaged in mechanical pursuits and was employed as a master block maker in the Brooklyn Navy Yard in 1857. He was a member of the New York City Council, and was a Supervisor of New York County in 1863 and 1864.

Congress 
Fox was elected as a Democrat to the 40th and 41st United States Congresses, holding office from March 4, 1867, to March 3, 1871. He was a member of the New York State Senate (4th D.) in 1874 and 1875.

Later career and death 
He was president of the National Democratic Club from 1894 to 1910 and engaged in business as an iron merchant.

He died in New York City on January 17, 1914, and was buried at the Calvary Cemetery in Woodside, Queens.

External links
 
 

1835 births
1914 deaths
Businesspeople from New Brunswick
Pre-Confederation Canadian emigrants to the United States
Burials at Calvary Cemetery (Queens)
Democratic Party New York (state) state senators
New York City Council members
19th-century American businesspeople
Politicians from Fredericton
Democratic Party members of the United States House of Representatives from New York (state)
Canadian people of Irish descent
19th-century American politicians